N-Desmethylclozapine (NDMC), or norclozapine, is a major active metabolite of the atypical antipsychotic drug clozapine. Unlike clozapine, it possesses intrinsic activity at the D2/D3 receptors, and acts as a weak partial agonist at these sites similarly to aripiprazole and bifeprunox. Notably, NDMC has also been shown to act as a potent and efficacious agonist at the M1 and δ-opioid receptors, unlike clozapine as well. It was hypothesized that on account of these unique actions, NDMC might underlie the clinical superiority of clozapine over other antipsychotics. However, clinical trials found NMDC itself ineffective in the treatment of schizophrenia. This may be because it possesses relatively low D2/D3 occupancy compared to 5-HT2 (<15% versus 64-79% at a dose of 10–60 mg/kg s.c. in animal studies). Albeit not useful in the treatment of positive symptoms on its own, it cannot be ruled out that NDMC may contribute to the efficacy of clozapine on cognitive and/or negative symptoms.

See also 
 Clozapine
 DHA-clozapine
 Loxapine

References 

Antipsychotics
Chloroarenes
Delta-opioid receptor agonists
Dibenzodiazepines
Mu-opioid receptor agonists
Muscarinic agonists
Piperazines
Human drug metabolites